Lower Buckhorn Lake is a lake located within the townships of Selwyn and Trent Lakes  in Peterborough County, Ontario, Canada and is one of the Kawartha Lakes. Numerous small islands are located within the lake while the southern area is dominated by a large bay known as Deer Bay. Lovesick Lake is the eastern end of Lower Buckhorn and separated mainly by Wolf Island.

See also
List of lakes in Ontario

References
 "Lower Buckhorn Lake". Geographical Names Database. Natural Resources Canada. Retrieved 2012-01-08.

Lakes of Peterborough County